Elhamra Cinema was built in 1926 in Izmir, Turkey. It was designed by Architect Tahsin Sermet Bey. It was built for public use as a theatre, currently it is being using as the Izmir State Opera and Ballet.

Formal qualities

It is a symmetrical composition. The part with the dome is higher than the other parts in terms of its importance, because that's where the performances take place. The style of the building is neoclassical. As we can perceive from the columns, the dome, and the symmetrical composition. Also it has Turkish motif like ceramic glaze. These combine the western and eastern architecture.

Structure and material qualities
There is an arch-like wall between the ground floor and the dome which relieves the weight of the dome, also holds the dome together in an architectural and aesthetic way. Most of the building is concrete and painted to greenish yellow. The dome is green. The windows and the doors are made out of wood. The frames of the windows and doors, and the columns are made out of marble. Also the ceramic glazes are blue and because of that they have a harmony with the walls.

References

Elhamra Sineması, Doç. Dr. Necmi ÜLKER (İzmir Milli Kütüphane)
İzmir Mimarlık Rehberi, Deniz Güner

Buildings and structures in İzmir
Theatres in Turkey
Theatres completed in 1912
1912 establishments in the Ottoman Empire